Acmeism, or the Guild of Poets, was a transient poetic school, which emerged in 1912 in Russia under the leadership of Nikolay Gumilev and Sergei Gorodetsky. Their ideals were compactness of form and clarity of expression. The term was coined after the Greek word άκμη (ákmē), i.e., "the best age of man".

The acmeist mood was first announced by Mikhail Kuzmin in his 1910 essay "Concerning Beautiful Clarity". The acmeists contrasted the ideal of Apollonian clarity (hence the name of their journal, Apollon) to "Dionysian frenzy" propagated by the Russian symbolist poets like Bely and Vyacheslav Ivanov. To the Symbolists' preoccupation with "intimations through symbols" they preferred "direct expression through images".

In his later manifesto "The Morning of Acmeism" (1913), Osip Mandelstam defined the movement as "a yearning for world culture". As a "neo-classical form of modernism", which essentialized "poetic craft and cultural continuity", the Guild of Poets placed Alexander Pope, Théophile Gautier, Rudyard Kipling, Innokentiy Annensky, and the Parnassian poets among their predecessors.

Major poets in this school include Osip Mandelstam, Nikolay Gumilev, Mikhail Kuzmin, Anna Akhmatova, and Georgiy Ivanov. The group originally met in The Stray Dog Cafe, St. Petersburg, then a celebrated meeting place for artists and writers. Mandelstam's collection of poems Stone (1912) is considered the movement's finest accomplishment.

Amongst the major acmeist poets, each interpreted acmeism in a different stylistic light, from Akhmatova's intimate poems on topics of love and relationships to Gumilev's narrative verse.

See also 

 Imagism
 Symbolist Poetry

References 

Russian poetry
Literary movements
Russian literary movements
1910 introductions
20th-century literature
20th-century Russian literature